El with tail (Ӆ ӆ; italics: Ӆ ӆ) is a letter of the Cyrillic script.  Its form is derived from the Cyrillic letter el (Л л) by adding a tail to the right leg.

In Khanty language it is sometimes used as a substitute for Ԯ, while in the Itelmen language it is sometimes used as a substitute for Ԓ.

Computing codes

See also
Ԯ ԯ : Cyrillic letter El with descender
Ԓ ԓ : Cyrillic letter El with hook
Ԡ ԡ : Cyrillic letter El with middle hook
Cyrillic characters in Unicode

Cyrillic letters with diacritics
Letters with hook